The Southeastern New England AVA is an American Viticultural Area that includes portions of thirteen counties in three New England states: Connecticut, Massachusetts, and Rhode Island.  The boundaries of the wine appellation include parts of New Haven, New London, and Middlesex counties in Connecticut; Bristol, Newport, Providence, and Washington counties in Rhode Island; and Barnstable, Bristol, Dukes, Nantucket, Norfolk, and Plymouth counties in Massachusetts.  The area stretches from just south of Boston, Massachusetts in the east to New London, Connecticut in the west, and includes all of the coastal islands and coastal plain within  of Long Island Sound, Cape Cod, or Massachusetts Bay.

The climate in the area is heavily influenced by the nearby presence of the oceanic waters, which moderate the range of temperatures in the vineyards.  Most vintners in the area have had the best success with cold-climate Vitis vinifera and French hybrid grape varietals. The region is located in hardiness zones 7a and 6b, with 7b found in Chatham on Cape Cod and areas of the north and east coasts of Nantucket.

References

American Viticultural Areas
Geography of Barnstable County, Massachusetts
Geography of Bristol County, Massachusetts
Geography of Bristol County, Rhode Island
Connecticut wine
Geography of Dukes County, Massachusetts
Massachusetts wine
Geography of Middlesex County, Connecticut
Geography of Nantucket, Massachusetts
New England
Geography of New Haven County, Connecticut
Geography of New London County, Connecticut
Geography of Norfolk County, Massachusetts
Geography of Newport County, Rhode Island
Geography of Plymouth County, Massachusetts
Geography of Providence County, Rhode Island
Rhode Island wine
Geography of Washington County, Rhode Island